Devulapalli (Telugu: దేవులపల్లి) may refer to:

People
 Devulapalli Krishnasastri (1887–1980), Telugu poet
 Devulapalli Amar (born 1957), Indian journalist

Other uses
 Devulapalli Village (Devulapalle), West Godavari district, Andhra Pradesh

Surnames of Indian origin